The 1943 season was the thirty-second season for Santos FC.

References

External links
Official Site 

Santos
1943
1943 in Brazilian football